Fred Uhl Ball was an American enamelist.

Personal life and education
Fred Uhl Ball was born in Oakland, California in 1945. His mother, Kathryn Uhl, was an illustrator and enamelist who taught life drawing at Mills College and his father, F. Carlton Ball, was a ceramist who headed the art department at Mills. His grandfather, George Uhl, was a silversmith. This family influence and involvement in the arts inspired him to explore fine art in his youth. By the age of 11 he had exhibited his work and given enameling demonstrations at the California State Fair. He received his bachelor's and master's degrees in fine art from Sacramento State University. He lived and worked in Sacramento. In September 1985, he was robbed and beaten outside of his studio. He died three months later from injuries sustained during the attack.

Fine art
In the early 1970s he began experimenting with placing torch-fired enamels on thin copper foil panels like a collage. Ball also explored the use of bronze as a surface by exposing white enamel at varying temperatures to create varied hues of color on the bronze. These early experiments, described as unorthodox, also had him exploring fire scale and liquid enamels, which are quite common in enameling today. In 1972 he published his first book, "Experimental Techniques in Enameling."

Ball was best known for his large scale murals. In 1976 he participated in Sacramento's federally funded Comprehensive Employment and Training Act, allowing him to create his first large-scale mural at the Sacramento Community Center. He also created a 6 foot by 62 foot mural at a Sacramento parking garage, one of the largest enamel murals, called The Way Home. The piece consists of 1,488, each 12 by 12 inch, enamel tiles set into panels which are bolted to a concrete wall. His success as a muralist allowed him to make a living through commissions and the opportunity to continue experimenting with technique. A large portion of his commissions came from corporate clients in Sacramento, including the piece The Great Sacramento Valley at Sutter General Hospital which, upon his death, was completed by his mother and artist Bruce Beck in December, 1986.

Reception
Ball's experiments and work within enameling allowed Ball to be described by the Enamel Arts Foundation as a foremost leader in the field. He was one of the first enamel artists to bringing enameling to a larger scale, from the traditional smaller sizes generally seen early in the field.

Notable exhibitions
Fred Uhl Ball Retrospective, 1987, Crocker Art Museum

Notable collections
Smithsonian American Art Museum, Washington, D.C.

References

Bibliography
Darty, Linda. The Art of Enameling: Techniques, Projects, Inspiration. Asheville: Lark Books (2004). 
Driesbach, Janice T. and Ruth Holland. California Crafts XV, Fred Uhl Ball Retrospective. Sacramento: Crocker Art Museum (1987).
Jenkins, Jean F. "Workshop Notes." Glass on Metal. 22.1 (2003): 11, 18–19, 23.

Publications
Ball, Fred Uhl. Experimental Techniques in Enameling. New York: Van Nostrand Reinhold (1972).

External links
"Experimentalist" by Beverly Sanders
Smithsonian American Art Museum's collection of works by Fred Uhl Ball

1945 births
1985 deaths
Artists from Oakland, California
Artists from Sacramento, California
American enamelers
California State University, Sacramento alumni
Deaths by beating in the United States
People murdered in California
American murder victims
20th-century ceramists
1985 murders in the United States